Captain Trips may refer to:
The first part of Stephen King's novel The Stand, named for the fictional disease outbreak described therein
The Stand: Captain Trips, the first volume of The Stand comic adaptation
Captain Trips (Wild Cards), a fictional character from the book series Wild Cards
A nickname of American musician Jerry Garcia (1942–1995)
The nickname of a hippie character in Stephen King's miniseries Golden Years
Alfred Matthew Hubbard (1901–1982), proponent for the drug LSD
"Captain Trips", a 2014 episode of the TV series Revolution